Dreaming of Babylon: A Private Eye Novel 1942 is Richard Brautigan's eighth novel and was published in 1977.  It is a black comedy set in San Francisco in 1942.  The central character, C. Card, is no Sam Spade, but actually does do detective work of a sort, when he's not off dreaming of Babylon.

External links
 Entry on brautigan.net

1977 American novels
Novels by Richard Brautigan
Fiction set in 1942
American mystery novels
Novels set in San Francisco
Black comedy books